Hart-Miller Island State Park is a state-owned, public recreation area located on Hart-Miller Island, a man-made landfill linking two natural Chesapeake Bay islands Hart and Miller at the mouth of Back River in Essex, Maryland. The state park is accessible only by boat. It is located in Essex, Maryland, 21221.

History
The islands comprising Hart and Miller with a total land surface of —was acquired by the state in the late 1970s. A dike was built joining Hart and Miller islands into Hart Miller Island in 1983, and the subsequent containment area was filled with dredge material from Baltimore harbor and the Patapsco River over the next 20 years.

Activities and amenities
The park features a  sandy beach, hiking trails, an observation tower, picnicking facilities, and sites for overnight camping. The north cell of the island's 1,100-acre surface area is closed; the south cell officially opened for public access in May 2016.

References

External links

Hart-Miller Island State Park Maryland Department of Natural Resources

State parks of Maryland
Parks in Baltimore County, Maryland
IUCN Category III